The Slovenian PrvaLiga, currently named Prva liga Telemach due to sponsorship reasons, also known by the abbreviation 1. SNL, is the top level of the Slovenian football league system. Contested by ten clubs, it operates on a system of promotion and relegation with the Slovenian Second League (2. SNL). Seasons typically run from July to May with each team playing 36 matches.

The competition was founded in 1991 after Slovenia became an independent country. From 1920 until the end of the 1990–91 season, the Slovenian Republic League was a lower division within the Yugoslav league system. The league is governed by the Football Association of Slovenia. Celje and Maribor are the only two founding clubs that have never been relegated from the league since its foundation in 1991.

44 clubs have competed since the inception of the PrvaLiga in 1991. Eight of them have won the title: Maribor (16), Gorica (4), Olimpija (4), Domžale (2), Olimpija Ljubljana (2), Koper (1), Celje (1) and Mura (1).

History

The Slovenian First League (1. SNL) was established after Slovenia's independence in 1991, and initially consisted of 21 clubs in the inaugural season. Prior to that, Slovenian teams competed in the Yugoslav football league system. Olimpija, Maribor and Nafta were the only Slovenian teams to play in the Yugoslav top division between 1945 and the breakup of Yugoslavia in 1991. While they were part of the Yugoslav football system, most Slovenian clubs competed for the title of regional champions in the Slovenian Republic League, the third tier of Yugoslav football.

In 1991, the Football Association of Slovenia separated from the Football Association of Yugoslavia and established its own competitions, where Slovenian clubs competed for the title of Slovenian national champions. As of 2022, Celje and Maribor remains the only two founding clubs that have never been relegated from the league since the inaugural 1991–92 edition. The competition format and the number of clubs in the league have changed over time, ranging from 21 clubs in the first season to 10 clubs in its present form.

Olimpija won the first title. They had a long tradition of playing in the Yugoslav First League and their squad was still composed of players from that era. Olimpija dominated the league and won a further three championships before Gorica won their first in the 1995–96 season. Following Gorica's success, Maribor won their first championship in 1997. This started a record-breaking streak of seven successive league championships which came to an end when Gorica won their second title in the 2003–04 season. The club from Nova Gorica went on to win an additional two titles, becoming the third club to win three consecutive championships. During the 2006–07 season, Domžale won their first title, a feat they repeated the following season. After the 2008–09 season, Maribor became the major force in Slovenian football for the second time, having won 9 out of 14 championships since then.

Maribor is the most successful club; they have won the championship 16 times, more than all other clubs combined. Seven of Maribor's titles came during the late 1990s and early 2000s when the club was led alternately by managers Bojan Prašnikar, Ivo Šušak and Matjaž Kek. Darko Milanič has led the club to four championships between 2009 and 2013. Olimpija has won four titles, all in successive years between 1992 and 1995. Tied with four championships is Gorica who won their first title in 1996 and an additional three in successive years between 2004 and 2006. Domžale and Olimpija Ljubljana have won two titles each, followed by Koper, who won their only championship in 2010. Maribor has won the Slovenian version of the double the most; they have won the league and the cup four times in the same season.

Names
Since 1991, the league has been named after sponsors on several occasions, giving it the following names:

Format

PrvaLiga is contested on a round-robin basis. Each team play against each other four times, twice at home and twice away, for a total of 36 rounds. Teams receive three points for a win, one point for a draw, and no points for a loss. Teams are ranked according to the total sum of points and if two teams are tied, head-to-head score is used as the first classification criteria. At the end of the season, the top three clubs qualify for the UEFA Champions League and the UEFA Europa Conference League qualifying rounds, with the ninth-placed team being qualified for the relegation play-offs and the bottom one being relegated to the Slovenian Second League.

The current system is in use since 2005. Between 1993 and 1995, a regular double round-robin format with 16 clubs was used, before being replaced with the current ten-club system for three seasons until 1998. Triple round-robin with twelve clubs and two direct relegations was then used between 1998 and 2003. In the next two seasons, in 2003–04 and 2004–05, the league was divided into the championship and relegation groups after the end of the regular season.

List of champions

Performance by club

Clubs

2022–23 season
Below is the list of clubs that are members of the 2022–23 Slovenian PrvaLiga season. The information and the statistics shown in the table are correct as of the end of the 2021–22 season.

UEFA coefficient

Correct as of 27 May 2022. The table shows the position of the Slovenian PrvaLiga, based on their UEFA coefficient country ranking, and the four foreign leagues closest to the PrvaLiga's position (two leagues with a higher coefficient and two with a lower coefficient).

Statistics

Top scorers

Awards

Trophy
The current trophy is being presented since the 2012–13 season and was designed by Mirko Bratuša, a sculptor from Negova. It depicts a ball with eleven star-shaped holes and inside there are eleven players holding together and looking at the sky. It is made of brass, bronze and gold, and weighs .

Player awards
The first Player of the Year awards were presented by Slovenian newspaper Dnevnik in the early 1990s. Between 1996 and 1999, they were presented by Ekipa, and since 2004, the awards have been organized by the Union of Professional Football Players of Slovenia (SPINS).

Player of the Year
 1991 Miloš Breznikar
 1992 Vlado Miloševič
 1993 Gregor Židan
 1994 Džoni Novak
 1995 Sandi Valentinčič
 2004 Damir Pekič and Dražen Žeželj
 2005 Saša Ranić
 2006 Ermin Rakovič
 2007–08 Amer Jukan
 2008–09 Marcos Tavares
 2009–10 Miran Pavlin
 2010–11 Marcos Tavares
 2011–12 Dare Vršič
 2012–13 Agim Ibraimi
 2013–14 Massimo Coda
 2014–15 Benjamin Verbič
 2015–16 Rok Kronaveter
 2016–17 Dare Vršič
 2017–18 Senijad Ibričić
 2018–19 Rudi Požeg Vancaš
 2019–20 Mitja Lotrič
 2020–21 Senijad Ibričić
 2021–22 Ognjen Mudrinski

Young player of the Year
 2011–12 Boban Jović
 2012–13 Boban Jović
 2013–14 Martin Milec
 2014–15 Benjamin Verbič
 2015–16 Miha Zajc
 2016–17 Luka Zahović
 2017–18 Luka Zahović
 2018–19 Jan Mlakar
 2019–20 Dario Vizinger
 2020–21 Timi Max Elšnik
 2021–22 Tomi Horvat

Manager awards
Manager awards weren't presented between 2012 and 2019.

Manager of the Year
 2011–12 Darko Milanič
 2018–19 Ante Šimundža
 2019–20 Dušan Kosič
 2020–21 Dejan Djuranović
 2021–22 Zoran Zeljković

Broadcast
During the early years, the league was broadcast only by the national public broadcasting television, RTV Slovenija. From 2008 until 2012, they had joint broadcasts with Šport TV, and from 2013 until 2015 with Planet TV. In the 2015–16 and 2016–17 seasons, the league was broadcast exclusively on Kanal A. In the 2017–18 season, the league was broadcast jointly by Kanal A and Šport TV. In the first round of the season, all five games were broadcast live for the first time in the league history.

Between 2018–19 and 2020–21, the league was broadcast jointly by Planet TV and RTV Slovenija. With the start of the 2019–20 season, one match per week is also broadcast on local Sportklub channels in Bosnia and Herzegovina, Croatia, Montenegro, North Macedonia and Serbia. From 2021–22 onwards, the league is being broadcast by Sportklub and Šport TV; all five matches per round are broadcast live, with Sportklub broadcasting four matches and Šport TV one. From the 2022–23 season, the league is also broadcast in Poland on Sportklub Polska.

References

External links
Official website 
UEFA profile
Soccerway profile

 
Slovenia
1
Sports leagues established in 1991
1991 establishments in Slovenia
Professional sports leagues in Slovenia